The Texas Rangers 2002 season involved the Rangers finishing 4th in the American League west with a record of 72 wins and 90 losses.

Preseason
 October 29, 2001: Edinson Vólquez was signed by the Rangers as an amateur free agent.
 November 26, 2001: Todd Van Poppel was signed as a free agent by the Rangers.
December 13, 2001: John Vander Wal was traded by the San Francisco Giants to the New York Yankees for Jay Witasick.
December 18, 2001: Dave Elder was traded by the Rangers to the Cleveland Indians for John Rocker.
January 8, 2002: Juan González was signed as a free agent by the Rangers.
February 28, 2002: Tony Mounce was signed as a free agent by the Rangers.
March 19, 2002: Justin Duchscherer was traded by the Texas Rangers to the Oakland Athletics for Luis Vizcaíno.

Regular season

Opening Day Starters

Iván Rodríguez, C
Rafael Palmeiro, 1B
Michael Young, 2B
Hank Blalock, 3B
Alex Rodriguez, SS
Gabe Kapler, LF
Carl Everett, CF
Juan González, RF
Frank Catalanotto, DH
Chan Ho Park, RHP

Season Summary
 Alex Rodriguez had a major league-best 57 HR, 142 RBI and 389 total bases in 2002, becoming the first player to lead the majors in all three categories since 1984. He had the 6th-most home runs in AL history, the most since Roger Maris' league record 61 in 1961, and the most ever for a shortstop for the 2nd straight year while also winning his first Gold Glove Award, awarded for outstanding defense.
 The 109 home runs hit by Alex Rodriguez in 2001–02 are the most ever by an American League right-handed batter in consecutive seasons.  However, the Rangers finished last in the AL Western division in both years, a showing that likely cost Rodriguez the MVP award in 2002 when he finished second to fellow shortstop Miguel Tejada, whose 103-win Oakland A's won the same division.
The Rangers set the Major League record for most consecutive games with at least one home run, with 27, which eventually was broken in 2019 by the New York Yankees.

Season standings

American League Wild Card

Record vs. opponents

Transactions
July 31, 2002: Gabe Kapler, Jason Romano and cash were traded by the Rangers to the Colorado Rockies for Dennys Reyes and Todd Hollandsworth.

Roster

Player stats

Batting

Starters by position
Note: Pos = Position; G = Games played; AB = At bats; H = Hits; Avg. = Batting average; HR = Home runs; RBI = Runs batted in

Other batters
Note: G = Games played; AB = At bats; H = Hits; Avg. = Batting average; HR = Home runs; RBI = Runs batted in

Pitching

Starting pitchers
Note: G = Games pitched; IP = Innings pitched; W = Wins; L = Losses; ERA = Earned run average; SO = Strikeouts

Other pitchers
Note: G = Games pitched; IP = Innings pitched; W = Wins; L = Losses; ERA = Earned run average; SO = Strikeouts

Relief pitchers
Note: G = Games pitched; IP = Innings pitched; W = Wins; L = Losses; SV = Saves; ERA = Earned run average; SO = Strikeouts

Awards and honors
Alex Rodriguez, Hank Aaron Award
Alex Rodriguez, A.L. Home Run Champ
Alex Rodriguez, SS, AL Gold Glove
Alex Rodriguez, Silver Slugger Award,
Kenny Rogers, P, Gold Glove,

All-Star Game

Farm system

LEAGUE CHAMPIONS: Charlotte

References

2002 Texas Rangers team page at Baseball Reference
2002 Texas Rangers team page at www.baseball-almanac.com

Texas Rangers seasons
Range
Texas Rangers